The Cathedral Church of All Saints is an Episcopal cathedral in St. Thomas, U.S. Virgin Islands, United States. It is the seat of the Diocese of the Virgin Islands and it is located in the City of Charlotte Amalie.  The church was built in 1848 in celebration of the end of slavery.  The structure was constructed from stone that was quarried on the island.  The gothic arched window frames are lined with yellow brick that was used as ballast aboard ships.  The bricks were left by merchants on the waterfront to make room on their boats for molasses, sugar, mahogany and rum for their return voyage.

See also
List of the Episcopal cathedrals of the United States
List of cathedrals in the United States
All Saints Cathedral School

References

Churches completed in 1848
19th-century Episcopal church buildings
Gothic Revival architecture in the United States Virgin Islands
Cathedrals in the United States Virgin Islands
All Saints, St. Thomas
Anglican cathedrals in the Caribbean
Churches in the Caribbean
Saint Thomas, U.S. Virgin Islands
1840s establishments in the Caribbean
1848 establishments in North America